Lindsey Broad is an American television, stage, and film actress. She is best known for her role as flirtatious temp Cathy Simms on the NBC series The Office. Her film credits include 21 Jump Street, Don Jon, and Get Him to the Greek. She also starred on the Fox sitcom 'Til Death and appeared opposite Stephen Merchant on the HBO series Hello Ladies. Her theatre credits include the world premiere of Sukie and Sue: Their Story, by Michael John LaChiusa, at the Blank Theatre.

She starred as Karen Rosenberg on the IFC series Benders, which was canceled in 2015.

Filmography

Film

Television

References

External links

 

American film actresses
American television actresses
Living people
Pennsylvania State University alumni
Year of birth missing (living people)
Place of birth missing (living people)
American stage actresses
21st-century American actresses